The Ramsey Harbour Swing Bridge is located on the Isle of Man and links the town centre in Ramsey with the Mooragh Promenade.

History
The bridge, which incorporates two steel trussed arches, was completed by Cleveland Bridge & Engineering Company in 1892. The bridge was refurbished in Winter 2013.

References

Buildings and structures in the Isle of Man